The Curzon Hall is a British Raj-era building  and home of the Faculty of Sciences at the University of Dhaka.

The building was originally intended to be a town hall and is named after Lord Curzon, the Viceroy of India who laid its foundation stone in 1904. Upon the establishment of Dacca University in 1921, it became the base of the university's science faculty.

Language movement
During the Bengali Language Movement, 1948–1956, Curzon Hall was the location of various significant events. After the Partition of India in 1947 that formed the country of Pakistan, Urdu was chosen to be the sole state language. In 1948, the Constituent Assembly of Pakistan chose Urdu and English as the only languages to be used to address the assembly, which was protested within the assembly on the grounds that the majority of the people spoke Bangla and not Urdu. Students of Dhaka University objected instantly to the actions of the Constituent Assembly, and it was in Curzon Hall that they declared their opposition to the state language policy.

Facilities
The Botanical Garden of the university is located on the premises of Curzon Hall, and is used by students and faculty for teaching botany and for scientific studies with plants.

Architecture

One of the best examples of Dhaka's architecture, it is a happy blend of European and Mughal elements, particularly noticeable in the projecting facade in the north which has both horse-shoe and cusped arches.

Gallery

References

University of Dhaka
Buildings and structures in Dhaka
Indo-Saracenic Revival architecture
British colonial architecture in Bangladesh
Tourist attractions in Dhaka